Ondina perezi is a species of sea snail, a marine gastropod mollusk in the family Pyramidellidae, the pyrams and their allies.

Description
The shell grows to a length of 3 mm.

Distribution
This species occurs in the following locations:
 United Kingdom Exclusive Economic Zone, Faroes
 European waters : from Southern Sweden to Northern France.

References

External links
 To Encyclopedia of Life
 To GenBank
 To World Register of Marine Species

Pyramidellidae
Gastropods described in 1925